Eoactinistia is a prehistoric lobe-finned fish which lived during the Early Devonian period. Fossils have been found in Victoria, Australia.

References

Coelacanthiformes
Prehistoric lobe-finned fish genera
Devonian bony fish
Early Devonian fish
Prehistoric fish of Australia